Toolara Forest is a locality split between Gympie Region and Fraser Coast Region, Queensland, Australia. In the  Toolara Forest had a population of 0 people.

Geography 
The locality of Toolara Forest is mostly in the Gympie Region with only two small northern parts of the locality in the Fraser Coast Region.

Tin Can Bay Road (from Gympie to Tin Can Bay) enters the south-west of the locality from Goomboorian and Kia Ora and exits in the north-east of the locality into Wallu and then to Tin Can Bay. In the north-east there are two road junctions off Tin Can Bay; the Maryborough-Cooloola Road heads north-west towards Maryborough via Tuan Forest, while the Rainbow Beach Road heads south-east via Cooloola to Rainbow Beach on the Pacific Ocean coast.

The land use is almost entirely dedicated to the Toolara State Forest with the exception of a narrow strip of land in the east of the locality bounded by Rainbow Beach Road which contains the Cooloola Coast Cemetery and the remainder is a small part of the Great Sandy National Park which is mostly in the neighbouring locality of Cooloola. There is no residential land.

History
In the  Toolara Forest had a population of 0 people.

References

External links 

 Cooloola Coast Cemetery

Gympie Region
Fraser Coast Region
Localities in Queensland